Schinia diffusa is a moth of the family Noctuidae. It is found in North America, including Colorado and Texas.

The wingspan is 23–28 mm.

The larvae feed on Machaeranthera annua.

External links
Images

Schinia
Moths of North America
Moths described in 1891